Kolej is the Turkish word for college though it is used as a supplementary title for private high schools in Turkey. The name originates from Robert College, the first American educational institution founded outside of the United States. Though founded as a college, Robert College has been operating as a private high school since 1971. According to the Turkish education system, official name for a private high school is the direct translation, özel lise, not kolej. 

The word "Kolej" is regularly used to refer to TED Ankara College in Turkey. Additionally, Kolej is a neighborhood named after Ankara Koleji, in the Çankaya district of Ankara, the capital of Turkey.

See also
 Robert College of Istanbul
 TED Ankara College Foundation Schools
 College

Education in Turkey
Turkish words and phrases

tr:Kolej